Poet (Akyn) is a 2021 Kazakhstani drama film written and directed by Darezhan Omirbaev. Based on The Author’s Evening by Hermann Hesse, the film depicts story of Didar, a poet chained to his day job in a small newspaper. While reading about a 19th century famous Kazakh poet, Makhambet Otemisuly, who was executed by the authorities, he feels deeply shaken, realizing how difficult and fragile is the life of a poet. It had its world premiere at the 34th Tokyo International Film Festival on 31 October 2021, where it won best director award. 

In February 2022 it was screened at 72nd Berlin International Film Festival. It was released theatrically in France on 14 December 2022.

Cast
 Yerdos Kanayev as Didar
 Gulmira Khasanova as Zere
 Klara Kabylgazina as Poet's mother
 Serik Salkinbayev
 Bolat Shanin
 Aida Abdurakhman

Production
Darezhan Omirbayev conceived the idea for the screenplay, when he was reading a short story The Author’s Evening by Herman Hesse, whose lead character was an artist.

Release

The film had its world premiere at thr 34th Tokyo International Film Festival on 31 October 2021, where it won the best director award. It was invited at 72nd Berlin International Film Festival in 'Forum section'. On 18 August 2022, the film was screened at 46th Hong Kong International Film Festival in Global Vision section of World Cinema. On 21 October 2022, it was screened at the 2022 Vienna International Film Festival in Features section. In November 2022, it was invited at the Lisbon & Sintra Film Festival 2022, where it won the Best Film award.

Reception
In France, the AlloCiné rated the film  3.9/5, based on 12 reviews, which is an 'Average grade'.

Panos Kotzathanasis writing in Asian Movie Pulse praised Yerdos Kanaev, writing, "he, as Didar gives a very fitting performance". He opined that the "editing implements a slow pace" though "it toned down by the different cinematic elements". Concluding, Kotzathanasis felt the film is "excellent". He wrote, "Poet  highlights that Darezhan Omirbayev is at the top of his art, particularly because he manages to present all his comments through an approach that is intelligent, funny, and rather artful at the same time." Joshua Morel at Critikat.com rated the film 3/5 and wrote, "Like its character, the film proves to be stubborn and never deviates from its line".  Morel opined that "more than a fight, poetry appears in it as an enterprise of resistance which consists in detecting, within the very interior of the capitalist machine, the beauty nestled in the most trivial elements." Vincent Ostria of  L'Humanité rated it with 5 stars and opined that Darezhan Omirbayev belongs to tongue-in-cheek movement, "which looks at the world in a dubious mode, while emphasising the beauty of a gesture and the irreducible strangeness of reality." Ostria concluded, "A rare, hushed and bewitching cinema."

Awards and nominations

References

External links
 
 

2021 films
2021 drama films
Kazakhstani drama films
Kazakh-language films
Films directed by Darezhan Omirbaev